Pitt Community College (PCC) is a public community college in Winterville, North Carolina in Pitt County. The college is part of the North Carolina Community College System. It has an enrollment of over 9,000 undergraduate students with a total of 11,771 students enrolled in the Curriculum Program. Pitt Community College is accredited by the Southern Association of Colleges and Schools to award associate degrees.

History 
PCC was chartered and designated by the North Carolina State Board of Education as an industrial education center in March, 1961. The college began its operation as Pitt Industrial Education Center during the same year. Dr. Lloyd Spaulding served as the director of the center. The programs developed and expanded, and in 1964, the school was designated a technical institute by the State Board of Education. The name was changed in July, 1964, to Pitt Technical Institute, and it opened in its new facility, the Vernon E. White Building, in September, 1964, with nine curricula and 96 students.

PCC first received school accreditation from the Southern Association of Colleges and Schools in 1969. In 1979, the North Carolina General Assembly enacted a bill that changed Pitt Technical Institute to Pitt Community College. The change brought about the addition of the two-year University Transfer programs.

A vocational education classroom and lab/shop building, the A.B. Whitley Building, was opened in February, 1990. The  facility provides space for the following programs: Machining Technology, Electronic Servicing, Electronic Engineering Technology, Architectural Technology, Manufacturing Engineering Technology, and Industrial Construction Technology. The Industrial and Construction Technology Division office is located in the Whitley Building. The Planning and Research Department is also located in the building.

In 1997, Pitt Community College, as well as the entire North Carolina Community College system, converted from a quarter system to a semester system.

Academics 
PCC offers 3,000 classes via the Internet, 465 hybrid classes, and 2,700 traditional courses. As of 2011, 11,771 curriculum students and 11,415 continuing education students were enrolled.  The average class size in 2011 was 24 with a 17:1 student to faculty ratio. PCC offers 44 associate degree programs, certificate programs, 22 diploma programs, and 18 University Transfer programs leading to bachelor's degrees at four-year institutions. Academic programs are divided into five categories: Arts and Sciences, Business, Construction and Industrial Technology, Health Sciences, and Legal Science and Public Services. PCC also has a large Adult Education and Community Service division.

Student life 
The college athletics teams are nicknamed the Bulldogs.

Notable people 

 Lonnie Chisenhall is an outfielder with the Cleveland Indians.

References

External links 
 Official website

 
1961 establishments in North Carolina
Buildings and structures in Pitt County, North Carolina
Education in Pitt County, North Carolina
Educational institutions established in 1961
North Carolina Community College System colleges
Two-year colleges in the United States
Universities and colleges accredited by the Southern Association of Colleges and Schools
NJCAA athletics